Frank Henry "Alf" Goddard (28 November 1897 in Brentford, Middlesex – 25 February 1981 in Ealing, London) was an English film actor.

Brother of a famous boxer, Alf Goddard was once a boxer too. He was also a trained athlete and a professional dancer. He served in the army in World War I and when he was invalided out he worked on munitions. He made his stage debut in a musical hall act in 1916. His first appearance in films was as a stunt double where he did a number of risky jobs like jumping off bridges and swimming in rough seas. This led to him being given acting parts. Later he moved on to comedy roles.

Filmography

 Mademoiselle from Armentieres (1926)
 White Heat (1926)
 Every Mother's Son (1926)
 Hindle Wakes (1927)
 Carry On (1927)
 The Flight Commander (1927)
 Second to None (1927)
 A Sister to Assist 'Er (1927)
 Downhill (1927)
 What Money Can Buy (1928)
 Smashing Through (1928)
 Balaclava (1928)
 Mademoiselle Parley Voo (1928)
 Sailors Don't Care (1928)
 You Know What Sailors Are (1928)
 The Last Post (1929)
 Down Channel (1929)
 High Treason (1929)
 Alf's Button (1930)
 The Nipper (1930)
 Bed and Breakfast (1930)
East Lynne on the Western Front (1931)
 Old Soldiers Never Die (1931)
 The Happy Ending (1931)
 Splinters in the Navy (1931)
 The Third String (1932)
 Enemy of the Police (1933)
 Too Many Wives (1933)
 The Pride of the Force (1933)
 Lost in the Legion (1934)
 It's a Bet (1935)
 Strictly Illegal (1935)
 No Limit (1935)
 The Amazing Quest of Ernest Bliss (1936)
 Song of Freedom (1936)
 The Squeaker (1937)
 Farewell Again (1937)
 King Solomon's Mines (1937)
 Non-Stop New York (1937)
 The Green Cockatoo (1937)
 Owd Bob (1938)
 Convict 99 (1938)
 Luck of the Navy (1938)
 The Ware Case (1938)
 The Drum (1938)
 Bank Holiday (1938)
 Sidewalks of London (1938)
 Night Journey (1938)
 Murder in Soho (1939)
 Let's Be Famous (1939)
 Return to Yesterday (1940)
 Spy for a Day (1940)
 A Window in London (1940)
 Convoy (1940)
 South American George (1941)
 The Young Mr. Pitt (1942)
 Much Too Shy (1942)
 The Saint Meets the Tiger (1943)
 They Met in the Dark (1943)
 The Butler's Dilemma (1943)
 The Way Ahead (1944)
 The Way to the Stars (1945)
 Perfect Strangers (1945)
 I'll Be Your Sweetheart (1945)
 Innocents in Paris (1953)

References

Bibliography
 Various Who's Whos of the 1930s.

External links
 

1897 births
1981 deaths
English male film actors
English male silent film actors
Male actors from London
20th-century English male actors